Lumsden may refer to:


Places
 Lumsden, Newfoundland and Labrador, Canada, a town
 Rural Municipality of Lumsden No. 189, Saskatchewan, Canada
 Lumsden, Saskatchewan, Canada, a town
 Lumsden (provincial electoral district), Saskatchewan, Canada
 Lumsden, New Zealand, a town
 Lumsden, Aberdeenshire, Scotland, a village

People
 Lumsden (surname)
 Lumsden Barkway (1878-1968), Anglican bishop
 Lumsden Hare (1874-1964), Irish actor
 Clan Lumsden, a Lowland Scottish clan

Other uses
 Lumsden baronets, a title in the Baronetage of the United Kingdom

See also
 Lumsden Heritage Trust, formed in 2013 in New Zealand